Torquay Museum is a museum in the town of Torquay, Devon, England. The building has been a grade II listed building since 1975.

Description 
The museum is located on Babbacombe Road in Torquay. It has numerous galleries, including one devoted to the local author Agatha Christie and another to local explorers and egyptology.

Awards 
The Museum was awarded designated status by the Arts Council for its Quaternary Cave Collection and Archive. The collection consists of around 30,000 items from many local excavated cave sites including Kent's Cavern, along with an associated archive of research materials extending into the first half of the 19th Century.

References 

Buildings and structures in Torquay
Museums in Devon
Grade II listed buildings in Devon